Daniëlle "Danny" van Rossem (born 10 June 1935) is a retired Dutch fencer. She competed in the women's individual and team foil events at the 1960 Summer Olympics.

References

External links
 

1935 births
Living people
Dutch female foil fencers
Olympic fencers of the Netherlands
Fencers at the 1960 Summer Olympics
Sportspeople from Rotterdam
20th-century Dutch women
20th-century Dutch people